Milax may refer to:

Milax, Azerbaijan
Milax (gastropod), a genus of land slugs in the family Milacidae